Swords are a three-piece band formed in 2010 from Dublin, Ireland consisting of Diane Anglim, Ian Frawley and Jarlath Canning. Swords have described themselves as an alternative band that blend guitars, synths, samples, drums, and piano hooks with haunting and intimate vocals.
Some music writers have compared the band to Yeah Yeah Yeahs, Ane Brun, Portishead, Cat Power & Zola Jesus.

Early demo
Swords' first demo was received positively by Irish critics, with Hot Press magazine's Jackie Hayden making Swords his "pick of the fortnight" in May 2011, noting their ticking rhythm and brilliant hooks and the same publication praising Anglim's "deceptively caustic vocals". With BalconyTV's video blogger Tina Edwards described Swords track Chasm as Electronica meets Zooey Deschanel (She and Him).

The same month saw their track "Chasm" winning the Hot Press and Bulmers Berry 'Whos Hiding in The Undergrowth' national songwriting, creative writing and artist competition.

Black Balloon
Swords released their debut EP Black Balloon in February 2012. The four track EP was produced by Karl Odlum, (brother of Grammy winning producer Dave Odlum) and included the a re-recording of the track Chasm and 3 new tracks including the title track Black Balloon. The EP was supported by a 25 date Irish Tour, which saw the band play venues like The Roisin Dubh & McCarthys Dingle and festivals like The Camden Crawl, Vantastival, Knockanstockan climaxing with a headline show on The Salty Dog Stage at Electric Picnic

Black Balloon was lauded by Hot Press Magazine, who regularly feature the band since its release, given a 4 star review by Music Review Unsigned, and described as multifaceted and a relief from world of single-strum guitar bands by Golden Plec. Entertainment.ie backed up this view calling the band 'unafraid' and stating that the EP 'stands out from the rest of the pack'.

Momentum gathered for the band off the back of these reviews and 2fm Broadcaster Dan Hegarty began to champion the band playing the title track from the EP regularly on his show and inviting the band for sessions in RTE 2FM's Studio 8 and a live session at the Electric Picnic festival.

One single was released from the Black Balloon EP – The track Chasm. Director Sebastian Escalante created the video for the single. He had already worked on live videos for Irish Acts villagers, Mick Flannery, Wallis Bird, The Ambience Affair, The Man Whom & Halves but had never directed an official video before.

The video was described as a 'Dark and Creepy affair' and was influenced by the work of Stanley Kubrick.

The tracks Chasm and Go where featured prominently on the soundtrack for the Ross Noble comedy horror movie Stitches.

Lions & Gold
On 13 November 2012, the Swords announced through their official website that they were back in the studio working on a debut album, once again with producer Karl Odlum and that they had spent time in a remote house in Kilkenny recording.

"All The Boys" was the first single to be released from the band's debut album on 26 March 2013. The track, which the band described as "the most direct on the album" was widely featured on national Irish radio and became Phantom 105.2's most played song, and the band the most played artist in June 2013. Hot Press described Bob Gallagher directed video for All The Boys as "brilliant".

On 4 June 2013, the band performed "The Menace" on the TV show Other Voices, along with John Grant, Marina & The Diamonds, and Gavin James. The show's producers calling the band 'uber talented'.

The second single "Lions & Gold", a slightly darker track with a soaring chorus gave a more realistic insight into the forthcoming album, beginning with a "claustrophobic sound" and developing into "a broader sonic landscape". The "bizarre" video for the track, an animation by a long time friend of the band's drummer, featured a "depressed animated character" who could not handle the society & city in which he existed but eventually found strength. The video made clever references to the band's previous videos and artwork.
"Lions & Gold" the single was also playlisted by Phantom 105.2 and again the band became the station's highest played artist in July 2013.

Lions & Gold the album was released on 5 July 2013 with the band headlining Dublin's fabled Whelan's venue for the album launch show.

The album was named 'Album of the week' on RTE 2fm radio by Dan Hegarty, the Sunday Business Post described it as "An intriguing, compelling debut". With many blogs heaping praise on Diane Anglim's Vocals.

The band toured Ireland to support the album including festival slots at The Camden Crawl, Valentia Isle Festival, Indiependence and noted performances at Electric Picnic where the Irish Times marked the band as "must see" act, and HWCH 13 in Dublin where Hot Press Magazine praised the band's "epic sound".

In September 2013, the band announced they had signed a publishing deal with UK label Smalltown America Music. Shortly after that the band made another television appearance on The Works on RTE One, followed up by a live radio session with Paul McLoone on the national broadcaster Today FM.

Tidal Waves
Following a prolonged period of songwriting and recording Swords returned a new single "Betty Machete", which premiered on Nialler9 in July 2016.

"Betty Machete" was described as "One of those songs that makes an immediate impression" by Nialler9 & "Insanely catchy. A triumph" by Hot Press. With The Last Mixed Tape calling it "A bold but organic departure from Swords previous work, by-the-throat music, made to grab people’s attention".

The band followed up with the single "The Letter" which Hot Press described as "mesmerizing".

"Sixty Thousand Years" was the third single taken from the album Tidal Waves and featured a video produced by Bold Puppy.

Swords released their second album Tidal Waves on 28 October 2016. The album made its debut at Number 1 in the iTunes Charts in Ireland and Number 3 in the full charts. A sold-out headline show at The Workmans Club Dublin was followed by a show at Other Voices in Dingle.

Tidal Waves was produced by producer Karl Odlum, and mastered by Mandy Parnell.

With the band noting "We gave a lot of thought to what type of songs we wanted to write, how we wanted to record and how the album should sound. We recorded live as much as possible and tried to let the songs breathe and stand alone without dense production or layers".

Various tracks from Tidal Waves got regular airplay on Ireland's main radio stations RTE 2fm and Today FM. It was also album of the month on 8 Radio. Critically the album was a success, the Irish Times describing it as an "assured collection" with "superb tunes" and placing at Number 3 on both 8Radio and The Last Mixed Tape's top albums of 2016, while Betty Machete featured on Nialler9 and Today FM's top tracks of 2016.

Band members
 Diane Anglim – Lead vocals, piano and synthesizer
 Jarlath Canning – Bass guitar, Guitar, backing vocals and synthesizer
 Ian Frawley – Drums

Discography
 Lions & Gold (2013)
 Tidal Waves (2016)

References

External links
 Official Swords website
 Breaking Tunes

Musical groups established in 2010
Irish indie rock groups
Musical groups from Dublin (city)
2010 establishments in Ireland